Gli Angeli Genève is a Baroque ensemble based in Geneva, Switzerland. Founded in 2005 by the bass-baritone, Stephan MacLeod, their debut performance was at the Festival Amadeus de Meinier. The ensemble performs an annual season of four concerts in Geneva, primarily dedicated to Bach's cantatas  and records for Sony Classical. Their debut album, German Baroque Cantatas Vol. 1 was the Gramophone "Editor's Choice" for November 2008. Their performance of Bach's St. Matthew Passion at the Victoria Hall in Geneva (1 March 2009) was broadcast by Radio Suisse Romande.

Recordings
German Baroque Cantatas Vol. 1 – Gli Angeli Genève; Stephan Macleod (conductor). Sony Classical (2008)
German Baroque Cantatas Vol. 2 – Gli Angeli Genève; Stephan Macleod (conductor). Sony Classical (2009)

Notes and references

Sources
Freeman-Attwood, Jonathan, "Editor's Choice: German Baroque Cantatas Vol. 1", Gramophone, November 2008
Lehnigk, Christiane, "Barock am Bass", Deutschlandradio, 8 June 2008
Pulver, Jonas, Stephen Macleod, Bach en voix intégrale, Le Temps, 28 November 2009
Radio Suisse Romande, "Chant libre", 22 March 2009

External links
Official website

Musical groups established in 2003
Swiss performers of early music